Screen Door is a popular Southern and soul food restaurant with two locations in Portland, Oregon, in the United States.

Description

Screen door is a popular Southern and soul food restaurant with two locations in Portland, Oregon. The original restaurant is located at 2337 East Burnside Street in the Kerns neighborhood. In 2021, a second location opened in northwest Portland's Pearl District.

Screen Door's specialty is crispy buttermilk-battered fried chicken, sometimes accompanied with sweet potato waffles. The menu also includes biscuits, fried green tomatoes, grits, macaroni and cheese, po' boy, pulled pork, and brisket; weekend brunch features Bananas Foster French toast and biscuits and gravy (sausage or vegetarian). The restaurant's hushpuppy recipe has been published by The Washington Post, and subsequently other outlets.

Screen Door often has a queue line. According to co-owner David Mouton, the restaurant can host as many as 500 customers per weekend. Wait times are sometimes shared via voicemail. Screen Door warns guests, "Good fried chicken takes time. Please consider this when ordering."

History
In 2013, the restaurant's head chef Rick Widmayer left after serving for six years, citing "creative differences". He said, "We'd had some creative clashes over the years and it finally got to the point where I wanted more freedom to experiment and to grow. Screen Door has such a rigid concept and criteria: over-the-top Southern…there's no room for change." Screen Door opened a second location in the Pearl District in 2021.

Reception

Screen Door has been associated with Portland's reputation as a food destination. 

In 2012, ABC News named Screen Door as one of the "Top Ten Restaurants in the Nation".
The Cooking Channel has recommended the restaurant for the "best Southern breakfast on the West Coast". Glamour recommended the fried chicken and sweet potato waffles on their "must-try list for "serious foodies'" (2013). The Portland Mercury has described the restaurant as "spacious yet cozy", with a varied menu.

In 2012, Portland Monthly reviewed and contrasted the restaurant's fried chicken and waffles with Simpatica's recipe in the magazine's "Battle for the Best Fried Chicken and Waffles" in the city. The magazine also included Screen Door's "Spicy Creole Bloody" recipe in its list of Portland's best Bloody Marys. The restaurant's mashed potatoes and tasso gravy recipe was a contender in Portland Monthly 2016 "Spud Bracket", which recognized the city's best potato "creations". The magazine also included the chicken and sweet potato waffle in a 2022 list of "The 12 Best Breakfasts in Portland".

Tom Sietsema of The Washington Post wrote, "If you have time for only one breakfast, make it this convivial Southern charmer, easy to spot due to the inevitable line out the door".

See also
 List of soul food restaurants
 List of Southern restaurants

References

External links

 
 
 
 

Southern restaurants
Kerns, Portland, Oregon
Pearl District, Portland, Oregon
Restaurants in Portland, Oregon
Soul food restaurants in the United States